Maddington is a small settlement and former civil parish on Salisbury Plain in Wiltshire, England. It is on the River Till.

At the time of the Domesday Book (1086), the manor was held by Amesbury Abbey. In 1825 the parish contained seventy-eight houses and had a population of 369. By 1841 the parish of Maddington extended east and south of the village.

For local government purposes, Maddington was added to the adjoining Shrewton parish in 1934. As Shrewton expanded during the 20th century, Maddington became an area of Shrewton.

St Mary's Church was built in the 13th century, then partly rebuilt in the 17th and 19th. It was declared redundant in 1975 and is now in the care of the Churches Conservation Trust.

Maddington Manor is a two-storey 18th-century house in brick, remodelled and extended at the front in the 1830s.

See also

Maddington Falls, Quebec, a small town in Canada which was named for this Maddington

References

External links
 
 Maddington at genuki.org.uk

Villages in Wiltshire
Former civil parishes in Wiltshire